MINDY lysine 48 deubiquitinase 4, also known as MINDY4, is a human gene.

Predictions
The predicted molecular weight is 84,400 Daltons and pI is 6.465. pTARGET predicts the cellular location to be in the golgi apparatus with 93.9% confidence.

Expression
Based on the human tissue Gene Expression Omnibus profile, C7orf67 shows a marked increase in expression in the teratospermia disease state.

References

External links